June 13 - Eastern Orthodox Church calendar - June 15

All fixed commemorations below celebrated on June 27 by Orthodox Churches on the Old Calendar.

For June 14th, Orthodox Churches on the Old Calendar commemorate the Saints listed on June 1.

Saints
 Prophet Elisha (9th century BC)
 Hieromartyr Cyril, Bishop of Gortyna on Crete (c. 303)  (see also: September 6, July 9)
 Venerable Julitta (Julia) of Tabennisi in Egypt (4th century)
 Saint Methodius the Confessor, Patriarch of Constantinople (846)

Pre-Schism Western saints
 Saint Marcian of Syracuse, Bishop of Syracuse (c. 255)
 Saints Valerius and Rufinus, martyrs in Soissons in France (c. 287)
 Saint Mark of Lucera, a bishop venerated locally in the south of Italy (c. 328)
 Saint Dogmael, a monk who lived in Dyfed and Anglesey in Wales and also in Brittany (5th-6th centuries)
 Saint Quintian of Rodez, a bishop in France (c. 525)
 Saint Ætherius (Éthére), Bishop of Vienne in France (c. 6th century)
 Saint Nennus (Nem Moccu Birn, Nenus, Nehemias), successor of St Enda as abbot of the monasteries of the Isles of Arran and Bute in Ireland (7th century)
 Saint Psalmodius, a hermit near Limoges (7th century)
 Saint Lotharius (Loyer), Bishop of Séez (c. 756)
 Saint Gerold (Gervold), a monk of Fontenelle and from 787 Bishop of Evreux in France (806)
 Saints Anastasius, Felix and Digna, Martyrs of Córdoba (853)
 Saint Ciarán of Dissert-Kieran (Cearan), Abbot of Bellach-Duin, now Castle Kerrant, in Ireland, he was called the devout (870)
 Saint Hartwig, twenty-first Archbishop of Salzburg in Austria (1023)
 Saint Richard of St Vannes (Richard of Verdun), called 'Gratia Dei' ('Thanks be to God'), from a phrase he often said; monk at St Vannes in Verdun  (1046)

Post-Schism Orthodox saints
 Saint John (Mavropos), Metropolitan of Euchaita (1100)
 Saint Mstislav-George, Prince of Novgorod (1180)
 Saint Methodius of Peshnosha, founder of Peshnosha Monastery, disciple of St. Sergius of Radonezh (1392)
 Venerable Niphon Kausokalybites of Mount Athos, proponent of hesychastic theology (1411)
 Venerable Elisha of Sumsk, monk of Suma (Solovki) (15th-16th centuries)

New martyrs and confessors
 New Hieromartyr Joseph Sikov, Priest (1918)
 New Hieromartyrs Alexander Parusnikov and Paul Ivanov, Priests, and Nicholas Zapolsky, Deacon (1938)
 11 New Hieromartyrs and Martyrs of Estonia, under the Soviet occupation (1940s):
 New Hieromartyrs Vassili Ristkok (1942), Johannes Kraav (1941), Joann Sergejev, Arteemi Vapper (1944) and Nikolai Leisman (1943), Priests;
 New Hieromartyrs Vassili Astanin and Peeter Koslov, Deacons;
 New Martyr Presvytera Marta Leisman (1943); 
 New Martyrs Joann Lagovski (1941), Theodor Petai (1942) and Anna Petai (1948)

Other commemorations
 Synaxis of the Saints of Diveyevo.
 Finding of the relics (1992) of New Hieromartyr Vladimir, Metropolitan of Kiev (1918)

Icon gallery

Notes

References

Sources
 June 14/27. Orthodox Calendar (PRAVOSLAVIE.RU).
 June 27 / June 14. HOLY TRINITY RUSSIAN ORTHODOX CHURCH (A parish of the Patriarchate of Moscow).
 June 14. OCA - The Lives of the Saints.
 The Autonomous Orthodox Metropolia of Western Europe and the Americas (ROCOR). St. Hilarion Calendar of Saints for the year of our Lord 2004. St. Hilarion Press (Austin, TX). p. 44.
 The Fourteenth Day of the Month of June. Orthodoxy in China.
 June 14. Latin Saints of the Orthodox Patriarchate of Rome.
 The Roman Martyrology. Transl. by the Archbishop of Baltimore. Last Edition, According to the Copy Printed at Rome in 1914. Revised Edition, with the Imprimatur of His Eminence Cardinal Gibbons. Baltimore: John Murphy Company, 1916. p. 173.
 Rev. Richard Stanton. A Menology of England and Wales, or, Brief Memorials of the Ancient British and English Saints Arranged According to the Calendar, Together with the Martyrs of the 16th and 17th Centuries. London: Burns & Oates, 1892. pp. 268–269.
Greek Sources
 Great Synaxaristes:  14 ΙΟΥΝΙΟΥ. ΜΕΓΑΣ ΣΥΝΑΞΑΡΙΣΤΗΣ.
  Συναξαριστής. 14 Ιουνίου. ECCLESIA.GR. (H ΕΚΚΛΗΣΙΑ ΤΗΣ ΕΛΛΑΔΟΣ). 
  14 Ιουνίου. Αποστολική Διακονία της Εκκλησίας της Ελλάδος (Apostoliki Diakonia of the Church of Greece).
  14/06/2017. Ορθόδοξος Συναξαριστής. 
Russian Sources
  27 июня (14 июня). Православная Энциклопедия под редакцией Патриарха Московского и всея Руси Кирилла (электронная версия). (Orthodox Encyclopedia - Pravenc.ru).
  14 июня по старому стилю / 27 июня по новому стилю. Русская Православная Церковь - Православный церковный календарь на 2017 год.
  14 июня (ст.ст.) 27 июня 2014 (нов. ст.). Русская Православная Церковь Отдел внешних церковных связей. (DECR).

June in the Eastern Orthodox calendar